Ifeoma Nwoye (born 1 May 1993) is a Nigerian wrestler.

Nwoye competed at the Commonwealth Games in 2010, where she won a gold medal in the freestyle 51kg event, and in 2014 where she won a bronze medal in the freestyle 55kg event.

References

1993 births
Living people
Nigerian female sport wrestlers
Wrestlers at the 2010 Commonwealth Games
Wrestlers at the 2014 Commonwealth Games
Commonwealth Games medallists in wrestling
Commonwealth Games gold medallists for Nigeria
Commonwealth Games bronze medallists for Nigeria
African Wrestling Championships medalists
21st-century Nigerian women
Medallists at the 2014 Commonwealth Games